Cul-De-Sacs and Dead Ends is a compilation of B-sides and singles by The Minders.

Track listing

References 

The Minders albums
1999 albums
SpinART Records albums